The women's 100 metres hurdles event at the 2007 Pan American Games was held on July 24–25.

Medalists

Results

Heats
Qualification: First 2 of each heat (Q) and the next 2 fastest (q) qualified for the final.

Wind:Heat 1: +0.6 m/s, Heat 2: +0.9 m/s, Heat 3: +0.2 m/s

Final
Wind: 0.0 m/s

References
Official results

100
2007
2007 in women's athletics